Isabelle Ahearn O'Neill (1880–1975) was a stage and screen actor of the silent film era, a suffragist, and the first woman elected to the Rhode Island Legislature. She also served in the state Senate and, under President Franklin Roosevelt, in the Federal Bureau of Narcotics. She was inducted into the Rhode Island Heritage Hall of Fame in 2014.

Early life and education
Isabelle Florence Ahearn was born in 1880 in Woonsocket, Rhode Island, the youngest of thirteen children of Mary J. (O'Connor) Ahearn and Daniel Ahearn. She was raised in Providence, Rhode Island, and was educated at the Boston College of Drama and Oratory. She also took physical education classes at Harvard University.

She married John Aloysius O'Neill in 1907; they had one child who died as an infant. The couple separated after three years but did not divorce because she was a Catholic.

Stage and film career
O'Neill began her career as a teacher, founding her own Ahearn School of Elocution in 1900, at the age of 20. Her students gave recitals at the Providence Opera House. Ahearn also worked as an actor for nearly two decades (1900–18), taking both lead and supporting roles in primarily summer stock and vaudeville shows in Rhode Island and New York. In 1915, she began to take roles in silent films like Joe Lincoln's Cape Cod Stories (Joseph C. Lincoln's Cape Cod Stories) made by the Providence-based Eastern Film Corporation.

Career in government
In the 1910s, O'Neill became an active suffragist and began to campaign for Democratic candidates in Rhode Island. She eventually left the stage and took her elocutionary skills into a career in politics. In 1922, she was elected to the Rhode Island House of Representatives from the 15th Assembly District, making her the first woman to hold office in the Rhode Island Legislature. She stayed in the House for eight years, supporting better protections for women in the workplace, better pay for teachers, and pensions for widows with children. A canny public speaker, she gave speeches in French and Italian to reach a broader cross-section of the electorate. She rose to the position of deputy Democratic floor leader before moving over to the state Senate in 1932.

In 1924 she served as the temporary chair of the Democratic National Convention.

At the request of President Franklin Roosevelt, she left the state Senate after only two years to serve as the president's legislative liaison to the Federal Bureau of Narcotics. In 1943, she resigned and returned to her home state, where she took an executive position at the Rhode Island Labor Department.

O'Neill retired in 1954 and died in 1975. Her papers are held by the Rhode Island Historical Society and include scrapbooks from her years as an actor and elocution teacher, as well as a brief autobiographical sketch.

Honors and awards
The resolution passed by the Rhode Island House of Representatives recognizing March 8, 2007, as "Women's History Day" specifically mentioned Ahearn's accomplishment in becoming the state's first woman legislator "just two short years after women gained the right to vote".

In 2011, the YWCA of Rhode Island created the Isabelle Ahearn O’Neill Award in her memory to honor the state's women leaders.

In 2014, she was inducted into the Rhode Island Heritage Hall of Fame.

References

Further reading
Adler, Emily Stier, and J. Stanley Lemons. "The Independent Woman: Rhode Island's First Woman Legislator". Rhode Island History 49:1 (February 1991), 3–6.
Adler, Emily Stier, and J. Stanley Lemons. The Elect: Rhode Island's Woman Legislators 1922–1990. League of Rhode Island Historical Societies, 1990.
Gregg, Katherine. "Isabelle Ahearn O'Neill: A Starring Role at the State House". Women in Rhode Island History. Rhode Island: Providence Journal, 1994.
McAvoy, Mary Carey. "Isabelle Ahearn O'Neill: Little Rhody's Lone Theodora". Woman's Voice 26 (March 1931), 12, 31.

External links
Isabelle Ahearn O'Neill papers at the Rhode Island Historical Society (finding aid)

1880 births
1975 deaths
People from Woonsocket, Rhode Island
American silent film actresses
20th-century American actresses
American stage actresses
Democratic Party members of the Rhode Island House of Representatives
Women state legislators in Rhode Island
Democratic Party Rhode Island state senators
20th-century American women politicians
20th-century American politicians